Godsend may refer to:

People
 Godsend, codename for Oscar Seborer (1921–2015), atomic spy for the Soviet Union (1941–1951)

Literature
The Godsend, 1976 novel by Bernard Taylor

Film
The Godsend (film), a 1980 British horror film adapted from Bernard Taylor's novel
 Godsend (2004 film), a 2004 American/Canadian science fiction horror film
 Godsend (2014 film), a 2014 South Korean drama film
 "Godsend" (Heroes), an episode of the television series Heroes

Music 
Godsend, an album by Nancy Wilson, 1984
Godsend, an album by Riley Clemmons, 2021
"Godsend", a song by DC Talk from the album Supernatural, 1998